The Trans-oriental Rally was a motor rally which started in St. Petersburg on June 12, 2008 and ended next to the Great Wall of China near Beijing on June 28, 2008.

Overview
It was an alternative to the Lisboa 2008 Dakar Rally which was cancelled due to fears of terrorism. Among the drivers on the race was François Delecour, two-time winner of the Monte Carlo Rally.

There were 16 legs planned:

Fatalities
To date there have been two fatalities on the race:
 Chinese driver Xu Lang, June 17 (from injuries sustained a day earlier)
 French motorcyclist Philippe Tonin, June 17

The latter fatality led the Russian Kamaz team to withdraw.

References 

 Motorsport.com article

External links 
 
 Weblog focusing on the performance of motorcycle participant Patricia Watson-Miller

Rally raid races